This is a list of the rulers and governors of the island of Crete throughout its history.

Antiquity
Crete was conquered for the Roman Republic by Quintus Caecilius Metellus Creticus in 69 BC and united with the Cyrenaica in the province of Creta et Cyrenaica until 193 AD, when it became a separate province.

Roman governors of Creta et Cyrenaica

Roman governors of Crete 
After the reforms of Emperor Diocletian in the 290s, Crete's governor held the rank of consularis.

Byzantine and Arab periods

Crete became part of the East Roman or Byzantine Empire upon the partition of the Roman Empire in 395 AD. It remained in Byzantine hands until it was conquered by Andalusian exiles in the mid-820s and became an emirate, nominally under Abbasid suzerainty. The emirate became a major base for Muslim naval raids along the coasts of the Byzantine Empire, and several attempts at reconquest failed. The Byzantines finally retook the island in 961 under the leadership of Nikephoros Phokas, and held it until 1205.

First Byzantine period
Proconsul
Helios (539)

Archon
Theophanes Lardotyros (c. 764–767)
John (8th century)
Leo (8th century)
Basil (8th century)
Baasakios (8th/9th century)
Nicholas (8th/9th century)
Nicholas (8th/9th century)
Petronas (first years of the 9th century)
Constantine (first quarter of the 9th century)

Strategos
Photeinos (827/828)

Emirs of Crete

Second Byzantine period
Strategos
Michael (10th/11th century)
Basil (c. 1000)
Bracheon Philaretos (c. 1028)
Eumathios (1028)

Doux (katepano)
Michael Karantenos (1088–1089)
Karykes (1090–1092)
Nikephoros Diogenes (before 1094)
Michael (11th/12th century)
John Elladas (1118)
John Straboromanos (mid-12th century)
Alexios Kontostephanos (1167)
Constantine Doukas (1183)
Stephen Kontostephanos (1193)
Nikephoros Kontostephanos (1197)

Venetian period, 1212–1669

Genoese governors, 1204–1212

Dukes of Crete, 1212–1669
The supreme Venetian governor of Crete bore the title of "Duke of Crete".

Ottoman period, 1646–1898

Valis of Crete

Modern period, 1898–today

High Commissioners of the Cretan State
Crete became an autonomous state under international protection and nominal Ottoman suzerainty following the Greco-Turkish War of 1897. A High Commissioner of the Great Powers (Ύπατος Αρμοστής) was installed to govern the island. In 1908, the Cretan Assembly unilaterally declared union with Greece, but this was not recognized by Greece until the outbreak of the First Balkan War in October 1912 and internationally until 1913.

Governors-General of Crete
From unification with Greece in 1912 until 1955, Crete as a whole was administered by a government-appointed governor-general, who supervised the administration of the island's four prefectures (Chania, Heraklion, Lasithi and Rethymno).

Notes: § denotes a person bearing cabinet rank as Minister General-Governor of Crete (Υπουργός Γενικός Διοικητής Κρήτης) or Vice-Minister General-Governor of Crete (Υφυπουργός Γενικός Διοικητής Κρήτης).

Regional governors of Crete
With the establishment of the region of Crete (Περιφέρεια Κρήτης) in 1986, Crete became again an administrative entity. Until 2011, the regional governors (περιφερειάρχες) were government-appointed, but in accordance to the Kallikratis reform they were replaced with elected officials.

Appointed governors

Elected governors

Notes

External links
 Rulers of Crete, from World Statesmen.org

 
Crete
Crete
Rulers
Crete